Lur Berri is a cooperative food company in south  west France, created in 1936.

History 
In 1936 the wheat cooperative was founded. Until 1965, activity focused on crop production in the Basque Country.

In 1971, the agricultural cooperative Lur Berri was born from a merger between grain cooperatives in the Basque Country and Lower Navarre.

From the 1980s, the cooperative grew quickly. It moved into livestock production (cattle, sheep, pigs and poultry) and acquired a number of cereal wholesalers: Bonnut, Garlin, Espoey, Artix, Clermont, and Coarraze-Nay. The group Lur Berri is active in the Pyrénées-Atlantiques, Landes, Hautes-Pyrénées, and most recently, the Tarn-et-Garonne.

Lur Berri's mission is to "assure our farmer partners the best value of their products".

2013 meat adulteration scandal 
On 14 February 2013, the French government confirmed that Spanghero, a French prepared meat producer of which Lur Berri owns 99%, knowingly sold horse meat labelled as beef in the 2013 meat adulteration scandal, and the company's licence was suspended while investigations continued.

References

External links 

Food and drink companies of France
Companies based in Nouvelle-Aquitaine
French companies established in 1936